Dimorphinites is an extinct genus from a well-known class of fossil cephalopods, the ammonites which lived during the Bajocian.

References

Jurassic ammonites